

Events

Pre-1600
1018 – Poland and the Holy Roman Empire conclude the Peace of Bautzen.
1287 – King Wareru founds the Hanthawaddy Kingdom, and proclaims independence from the Pagan Kingdom.

1601–1900
1607 – An estimated 200 square miles (51,800 ha) along the coasts of the Bristol Channel and Severn Estuary in England are destroyed by massive flooding, resulting in an estimated 2,000 deaths.
1648 – Eighty Years' War: The Treaty of Münster and Osnabrück is signed, ending the conflict between the Netherlands and Spain.
1649 – Charles I of England is executed in Whitehall, London.
1661 – Oliver Cromwell, Lord Protector of the Commonwealth of England, is ritually executed more than two years after his death, on the 12th anniversary of the execution of the monarch he himself deposed.
1703 – The Forty-seven rōnin, under the command of Ōishi Kuranosuke, avenge the death of their master, by killing Kira Yoshinaka.
1789 – Tây Sơn forces emerge victorious against Qing armies and liberate the capital Thăng Long.
1806 – The original Lower Trenton Bridge (also called the Trenton Makes the World Takes Bridge), which spans the Delaware River between Morrisville, Pennsylvania and Trenton, New Jersey, is opened.
1820 – Edward Bransfield sights the Trinity Peninsula and claims the discovery of Antarctica.
1826 – The Menai Suspension Bridge, considered the world's first modern suspension bridge, connecting the Isle of Anglesey to the north West coast of Wales, is opened.
1835 – In the first assassination attempt against a President of the United States, Richard Lawrence attempts to shoot president Andrew Jackson, but fails and is subdued by a crowd, including several congressmen as well as Jackson himself.
1847 – Yerba Buena, California is renamed San Francisco, California.
1858 – The first Hallé concert is given in Manchester, England, marking the official founding of The Hallé orchestra as a full-time, professional orchestra.
1889 – Archduke Crown Prince Rudolf of Austria, heir to the Austro-Hungarian crown, is found dead with his mistress Baroness Mary Vetsera in the Mayerling.

1901–present
1902 – The first Anglo-Japanese Alliance is signed in London.
1908 – Indian pacifist and leader Mohandas Karamchand Gandhi is released from prison by Jan C. Smuts after being tried and sentenced to two months in jail earlier in the month.
1911 – The destroyer  makes the first airplane rescue at sea saving the life of Douglas McCurdy  from Havana, Cuba.
1920 – Japanese carmaker Mazda is founded, initially as a cork-producing company.
1925 – The Government of Turkey expels Patriarch Constantine VI from Istanbul.
1930 – The Politburo of the Communist Party of the Soviet Union orders the confiscation of lands belonging to the Kulaks in a campaign of Dekulakization, resulting in the executions and forced deportations of millions.
1933 – Adolf Hitler's rise to power: Hitler takes office as the Chancellor of Germany.
1939 – During a speech in the Reichstag, Adolf Hitler makes a prediction about the end of the Jewish race in Europe if another world war were to occur.
1942 – World War II: Japanese forces invade the island of Ambon in the Dutch East Indies. Some 300 captured Allied troops are killed after the surrender. One-quarter of the remaining POWs remain alive at the end of the war.
1944 – World War II: The Battle of Cisterna, part of Operation Shingle, begins in central Italy.
1945 – World War II: The Wilhelm Gustloff, overfilled with German refugees, sinks in the Baltic Sea after being torpedoed by a Soviet submarine, killing approximately 9,500 people.
  1945   – World War II: Raid at Cabanatuan: One hundred and twenty-six American Rangers and Filipino resistance fighters liberate over 500 Allied prisoners from the Japanese-controlled Cabanatuan POW camp.
1948 – British South American Airways' Tudor IV Star Tiger disappears over the Bermuda Triangle. 
  1948   – Following the assassination of Mahatma Gandhi in his home compound, India's prime minister, Jawaharlal Nehru, broadcasts to the nation, saying "The light has gone out of our lives". The date of the assassination becomes observed as "Martyrs' Day" in India.
1956 – In the United States, Civil Rights Movement leader Martin Luther King Jr.'s home is bombed in retaliation for the Montgomery bus boycott.
1959 – The forces of the Sultanate of Muscat occupy the last strongholds of the Imamate of Oman, Saiq and Shuraijah, marking the end of Jebel Akhdar War in Oman.
1959 – , specifically designed to operate in icebound seas, strikes an iceberg on her maiden voyage and sinks, killing all 95 aboard.
1960 – The African National Party is founded in Chad, through the merger of traditionalist parties.
1964 – In a bloodless coup, General Nguyễn Khánh overthrows General Dương Văn Minh's military junta in South Vietnam.
1968 – Vietnam War: Tet Offensive launch by forces of the Viet Cong and North Vietnamese Army against South Vietnam, the United States, and their allies.
1969 – The Beatles' last public performance, on the roof of Apple Records in London. The impromptu concert is broken up by the police.
1972 – The Troubles: Bloody Sunday: British paratroopers open fire on anti-internment marchers in Derry, Northern Ireland, killing 13 people; another person later dies of injuries sustained.
  1972   – Pakistan leaves the Commonwealth of Nations in protest of its recognition of breakaway Bangladesh.
1974 – Pan Am Flight 806 crashes near Pago Pago International Airport in American Samoa, killing 97.
1975 – The Monitor National Marine Sanctuary is established as the first United States National Marine Sanctuary.
1979 – A Varig Boeing 707-323C freighter, flown by the same commander as Flight 820, disappears over the Pacific Ocean 30 minutes after taking off from Tokyo.
1982 – Richard Skrenta writes the first PC virus code, which is 400 lines long and disguised as an Apple boot program called "Elk Cloner".
1989 – The American embassy in Kabul, Afghanistan is closed.
1995 – Hydroxycarbamide becomes the first approved preventive treatment for sickle cell disease.
2000 – Kenya Airways Flight 431 crashes into the Atlantic Ocean off the coast of Ivory Coast, killing 169.
2013 – Naro-1 becomes the first carrier rocket launched by South Korea.
2020 – The World Health Organization declares the COVID-19 pandemic to be a Public Health Emergency of International Concern.

Births

Pre-1600
58 BC – Livia, Roman wife of Augustus (d. 29)
1410 – William Calthorpe, English knight (d. 1494)
1520 – William More, English courtier (d. 1600)
1563 – Franciscus Gomarus, Dutch theologian and academic (d. 1641)
1573 – Georg Friedrich, Margrave of Baden-Durlach (d. 1638)
1580 – Gundakar, Prince of Liechtenstein, court official in Vienna (d. 1658)
1590 – Lady Anne Clifford, 14th Baroness de Clifford (d. 1676)

1601–1900
1628 – George Villiers, 2nd Duke of Buckingham, English statesman (d. 1687)
1661 – Charles Rollin, French historian and educator (d. 1741)
1697 – Johann Joachim Quantz, German flute player and composer (d. 1773)
1703 – François Bigot, French politician (d. 1778)
1720 – Charles De Geer, Swedish entomologist and archaeologist (d. 1778)
1754 – John Lansing, Jr., American lawyer and politician (d. 1829)
1775 – Walter Savage Landor, English poet and author (d. 1864)
1781 – Adelbert von Chamisso, German botanist and poet (d. 1838)
1816 – Nathaniel P. Banks, American general and politician, 24th Governor of Massachusetts (d. 1894)
1822 – Franz Ritter von Hauer, Austrian geologist and curator (d. 1899)
1841 – Félix Faure, French politician, 7th President of France (d. 1899)
1844 – Richard Theodore Greener, American lawyer, academic, and diplomat (d. 1922)
1846 – Angela of the Cross, Spanish nun and saint (d. 1932)
1861 – Charles Martin Loeffler, German-American violinist and composer (d. 1935)
1862 – Walter Damrosch, German-American conductor and composer (d. 1950)
1866 – Gelett Burgess, American author, poet, and critic (d. 1951)
1878 – A. H. Tammsaare, Estonian author (d. 1940)
1882 – Franklin D. Roosevelt, American lawyer and statesman, 32nd President of the United States (d. 1945)
1889 – Jaishankar Prasad, Indian poet and playwright (d. 1937)
1899 – Max Theiler, South African-American virologist and academic, Nobel Prize laureate (d. 1972)
1900 – Martita Hunt, Argentine-born British actress (d. 1969)

1901–present
1901 – Rudolf Caracciola, German racing driver (d. 1959)
1902 – Nikolaus Pevsner, German-English historian and scholar (d. 1983)
1910 – Chidambaram Subramaniam, Indian lawyer and politician, Indian Minister of Defence (d. 2000)
1911 – Roy Eldridge, American jazz trumpet player (d. 1989)
1912 – Werner Hartmann, German physicist and academic (d. 1988)
  1912   – Francis Schaeffer, American pastor and theologian (d. 1984)
  1912   – Barbara W. Tuchman, American historian and author (d. 1989)
1913 – Amrita Sher-Gil, Hungarian-Indian painter (d. 1941)
1914 – Luc-Marie Bayle, French commander and painter (d. 2000)
  1914   – John Ireland, Canadian-American actor and director (d. 1992)
  1914   – David Wayne, American actor (d. 1995)
1915 – Joachim Peiper, German SS officer (d. 1976)
  1915   – John Profumo, English soldier and politician, Secretary of State for War (d. 2006)
1917 – Paul Frère, Belgian racing driver and journalist (d. 2008)
1918 – David Opatoshu, American actor and screenwriter (d. 1996)
1919 – Fred Korematsu, American activist (d. 2005)
1920 – Michael Anderson, English director and producer (d. 2018)
  1920   – Patrick Heron, British painter (d. 1999)
  1920   – Delbert Mann, American director and producer (d. 2007)
1922 – Dick Martin, American comedian, actor, and director (d. 2008)
1923 – Marianne Ferber, Czech-American economist and author (d. 2013)
1924 – S. N. Goenka, Burmese-Indian author and educator (d. 2013)
  1924   – Lloyd Alexander, American soldier and author (d. 2007)
1925 – Douglas Engelbart, American computer scientist, invented the computer mouse (d. 2013)
1927 – Olof Palme, Swedish statesman, 26th Prime Minister of Sweden (d. 1986)
1928 – Harold Prince, American director and producer (d. 2019)
1929 – Lois Hole, Canadian businesswoman and politician, 15th Lieutenant Governor of Alberta (d. 2005)
  1929   – Hugh Tayfield, South African cricketer (d. 1994)
  1929   – Lucille Teasdale-Corti, Canadian-Italian physician and humanitarian (d. 1996)
1930 – Gene Hackman, American actor and author
  1930   – Magnus Malan, South African general and politician, South African Minister of Defence (d. 2011)
1931 – John Crosbie, Canadian lawyer and politician, 34th Canadian Minister of Justice (d. 2020)
  1931   – Shirley Hazzard, Australian-American novelist, short story writer, and essayist (d. 2016)
1932 – Knock Yokoyama, Japanese comedian and politician (d. 2007)
1934 – Tammy Grimes, American actress and singer (d. 2016) 
1935 – Richard Brautigan, American novelist, poet, and short story writer (d. 1984)
  1935   – Tubby Hayes, English saxophonist and composer (d. 1973)
1936 – Horst Jankowski, German pianist and composer (d. 1998)
1937 – Vanessa Redgrave, English actress
  1937   – Boris Spassky, Russian chess player
1938 – Islam Karimov, Uzbek politician, 1st President of Uzbekistan (d. 2016)
1941 – Gregory Benford, American astrophysicist and author
  1941   – Dick Cheney, American businessman and politician, 46th Vice President of the United States
  1941   – Tineke Lagerberg, Dutch swimmer
1942 – Marty Balin, American singer-songwriter and guitarist (d. 2018)
1943 – Davey Johnson, American baseball player and manager
1944 – Lynn Harrell, American cellist and academic (d. 2020)
  1944   – Colin Rimer, English lawyer and judge
1945 – Meir Dagan, Israeli military officer and intelligence official, Director of Mossad (2002–11) (d. 2016)
  1945   – Michael Dorris, American author and scholar (d. 1997)
1946 – John Bird, Baron Bird, English publisher, founded The Big Issue
1947 – Les Barker, English poet and author
  1947   – Steve Marriott, English singer-songwriter and guitarist (d. 1991)
1949 – Peter Agre, American physician and biologist, Nobel Prize laureate
1950 – Jack Newton, Australian golfer
1951 – Phil Collins, English drummer, singer-songwriter, producer, and actor
  1951   – Charles S. Dutton, American actor and director
  1951   – Bobby Stokes, English footballer (d. 1995)
1952 – Doug Falconer, Canadian football player and producer (d. 2021)
1953 – Fred Hembeck, American author and illustrator
1955 – John Baldacci, American politician, 73rd Governor of Maine
  1955   – Curtis Strange, American golfer
1957 – Chris Jansing, American television reporter
  1957   – Payne Stewart, American golfer (d. 1999)
1959 – Steve Folkes, Australian rugby league player and coach (d. 2018)
  1959   – Jody Watley, American entertainer
1962 – Abdullah II of Jordan
  1962   – Mary Kay Letourneau, American child rapist (d. 2020)
1964 – Otis Smith, American basketball player, coach, and manager
1965 – Kevin Moore, Australian rugby league player and coach
1966 – Danielle Goyette, Canadian ice hockey player and coach
1968 – Felipe VI of Spain
1969 – Justin Skinner, English footballer and manager
1970 – Kimiya Yui, Japanese astronaut
1973 – Jalen Rose, American basketball player and sportscaster
1974 – Christian Bale, British actor
  1974   – Olivia Colman, English actress
1975 – Juninho Pernambucano, Brazilian footballer
1976 – Andy Milonakis, American entertainer
1978 – Carmen Küng, Swiss curler
  1978   – John Patterson, American baseball player
1979 – Trevor Gillies, Canadian ice hockey player
1980 – João Soares de Almeida Neto, Brazilian footballer
  1980   – Georgios Vakouftsis, Greek footballer
  1980   – Wilmer Valderrama, American actor and producer
1981 – Dimitar Berbatov, Bulgarian footballer
  1981   – Peter Crouch, English footballer
  1981   – Mathias Lauda, Austrian racing driver
1982 – Jorge Cantú, Mexican baseball player
1984 – Kotoshōgiku Kazuhiro, Japanese sumo wrestler
  1984   – Kid Cudi, American entertainer
1985 – Gisela Dulko, Argentinian tennis player
1987 – Becky Lynch, Irish wrestler
  1987   – Renato Santos, Brazilian footballer
  1987   – Arda Turan, Turkish footballer
1989 – Yoon Bo-ra, South Korean singer 
1990 – Mitchell Starc, Australian cricketer
  1990   – Phillip Supernaw, American football player
1991 – Stefan Elliott, Canadian ice hockey player 
1993 – Katy Marchant, English track cyclist 
  1993   – Thitipoom Techaapaikhun, Thai actor
1995 – Jack Laugher, English diver
1996 – Dafne Navarro, Mexican trampoline gymnast

Deaths

Pre-1600
 680 – Balthild, Frankish queen (b. 626) 
 970 – Peter I of Bulgaria
1030 – William V, Duke of Aquitaine (b. 969)
1181 – Emperor Takakura of Japan (b. 1161)
1240 – Pelagio Galvani, Leonese lawyer and cardinal (b. 1165)
1314 – Nicholas III of Saint Omer
1344 – William Montacute, 1st Earl of Salisbury (b. 1301)
1384 – Louis II, Count of Flanders (b. 1330)
1574 – Damião de Góis, Portuguese historian and philosopher (b. 1502)

1601–1900
1606 – Everard Digby, English criminal (b. 1578)
  1606   – John Grant, English conspirator (b. 1570)
  1606   – Robert Wintour, English conspirator (b. 1565)
1649 – Charles I of England, Scotland, and Ireland (b. 1600)
1664 – Cornelis de Graeff, Dutch mayor (b. 1599)
1730 – Peter II of Russia (b. 1715)
1770 – Giovanni Pietro Francesco Agius de Soldanis, Maltese linguist, historian and cleric (b. 1712)
1836 – Betsy Ross, American seamstress, said to have designed the American Flag (b. 1752)
1838 – Osceola, American tribal leader (b. 1804)
1858 – Coenraad Jacob Temminck, Dutch zoologist and ornithologist (b. 1778)
1867 – Emperor Kōmei of Japan (b. 1831)
1869 – William Carleton, Irish author (b. 1794)
1881 – Arthur O'Shaughnessy, English poet and herpetologist (b. 1844)
1889 – Rudolf, Crown Prince of Austria, heir apparent to the throne of Austria-Hungary (b. 1858)

1901–present
1926 – Barbara La Marr, American actress (b. 1896)
1928 – Johannes Fibiger, Danish physician and academic, Nobel Prize laureate (b. 1867)
1934 – Frank Nelson Doubleday, American publisher, founded the Doubleday Publishing Company (b. 1862)
1947 – Frederick Blackman, English botanist and physiologist (b. 1866)
1948 – Arthur Coningham, Australian air marshal (b. 1895)
  1948   – Mahatma Gandhi, leader of the Indian independence movement against British rule (b. 1869)
  1948   – Orville Wright, American pilot and engineer, co-founded the Wright Company (b. 1871)
1951 – Ferdinand Porsche, Austrian-German engineer and businessman, founded Porsche (b. 1875)
1958 – Jean Crotti, Swiss painter (b. 1878)
  1958   – Ernst Heinkel, German engineer and businessman; founded the Heinkel Aircraft Company (b. 1888)
1962 – Manuel de Abreu, Brazilian physician and engineer (b. 1894)
1963 – Francis Poulenc, French pianist and composer (b. 1899)
1966 – Jaan Hargel, Estonian flute player, conductor, and educator (b. 1912)
1968 – Makhanlal Chaturvedi, Indian poet, playwright, and journalist (b. 1889)
1969 – Dominique Pire, Belgian friar, Nobel Prize laureate (b. 1910) 
1973 – Elizabeth Baker, American economist and academic (b. 1885) 
1974 – Olav Roots, Estonian pianist and composer (b. 1910) 
1977 – Paul Marais de Beauchamp, French zoologist (b. 1883)
1980 – Professor Longhair, American singer-songwriter and pianist (b. 1918)
1982 – Lightnin' Hopkins, American singer-songwriter and guitarist (b. 1912)
1991 – John Bardeen, American physicist and engineer, Nobel Prize laureate (b. 1908)
  1991   – Clifton C. Edom, American photographer and educator (b. 1907)
1993 – Alexandra of Yugoslavia, the last Queen of Yugoslavia (b. 1921)
1994 – Pierre Boulle, French soldier and author (b. 1912)
1999 – Huntz Hall, American actor (b. 1919)
  1999   – Ed Herlihy, American journalist (b. 1909)
2001 – Jean-Pierre Aumont, French soldier and actor (b. 1911)
  2001   – Johnnie Johnson, English air marshal and pilot (b. 1915)
  2001   – Joseph Ransohoff, American surgeon and educator (b. 1915)
2004 – Egon Mayer, Swiss-American sociologist (b. 1944)
2005 – Martyn Bennett, Canadian-Scottish violinist (b. 1971)
2006 – Coretta Scott King, American author and activist (b. 1927)
  2006   – Wendy Wasserstein, American playwright and academic (b. 1950)
2007 – Sidney Sheldon, American author and screenwriter (b. 1917) 
2008 – Marcial Maciel, Mexican-American priest, founded the Legion of Christ and Regnum Christi (b. 1920)
2009 – H. Guy Hunt, American soldier, pastor, and politician, 49th Governor of Alabama (b. 1933)
2010 – Fadil Ferati, Kosovar accountant and politician (b. 1960)
2011 – John Barry, English composer and conductor (b. 1933)
2012 – Frank Aschenbrenner, American football player and soldier (b. 1925)
  2012   – Doeschka Meijsing, Dutch author (b. 1947)
2013 – Gamal al-Banna, Egyptian author and scholar (b. 1920)
  2013   – Patty Andrews, American singer (b. 1918)
  2013   – George Witt, American baseball player and coach (b. 1931)
2014 – Stefan Bałuk, Polish general and photographer (b. 1914)
  2014   – The Mighty Hannibal, American singer-songwriter and producer (b. 1939)
  2014   – William Motzing, American composer and conductor (b. 1937)
  2014   – Arthur Rankin, Jr., American director, producer, and screenwriter (b. 1924)
2015 – Carl Djerassi, Austrian-American chemist, author, and playwright (b. 1923)
  2015   – Ülo Kaevats, Estonian academic, philosopher, and politician (b. 1947)
  2015   – Geraldine McEwan, English actress (b. 1932)
  2015   – Gerrit Voorting, Dutch cyclist (b. 1923)
  2015   – Zhelyu Zhelev, Bulgarian philosopher and politician, 2nd President of Bulgaria (b. 1935)
2016 – Frank Finlay, English actor (b. 1926)
  2016   – Francisco Flores Pérez, Salvadorian politician, President of El Salvador (b. 1959)
  2016   – Georgia Davis Powers, American activist and politician (b. 1923)
2018 – Mark Salling, American actor and musician (b. 1982)
2019 – Dick Miller, American actor (b. 1928)
2021 – Sophie, Scottish musician (b. 1986)
2022 – Cheslie Kryst, American television presenter and model (b. 1991)
2023 – Bobby Beathard, American Pro Football Hall of Fame executive (b. 1937)
  2023   – Bobby Hull, Canadian ice hockey player (b. 1939)

Holidays and observances
 Christian Feast Day:
Adelelmus of Burgos
 Aldegonde
 Anthony the Great (Coptic Church)
 Armentarius of Pavia
 Balthild
 Charles, King and Martyr (various provinces of the Anglican Communion)
 Hippolytus of Rome
 Hyacintha Mariscotti
 Martina
 Matthias of Jerusalem
 Mutien-Marie Wiaux
 Savina
 Three Holy Hierarchs (Eastern Orthodox), and its related observances:
Teacher's Day (Greece)
 January 30 (Eastern Orthodox liturgics)
 Day of Azerbaijani customs (Azerbaijan)
 Day of Saudade (Brazil)
 Fred Korematsu Day (California, Florida, Hawaii, Virginia)
 Martyrdom of Mahatma Gandhi, and its related observances:
 Martyrs' Day (India)
 School Day of Non-violence and Peace (Spain)
 Start of the Season for Nonviolence (January 30 – April 4)

References

External links

 BBC: On This Day
 
 Historical Events on January 30

Days of the year
January